HMS Matchless was a Royal Navy Admiralty M-class destroyer. Matchless was built by Swan Hunter from 1913 to 1914 and was completed in December that year. She served through the remainder of the First World War, operating in the North Sea as part of the Harwich Force in the early part of the war and later in the English Channel as part of the Dover Patrol, where she took part in both the First and Second Ostend Raids. Despite being badly damaged by a German mine in 1915 and being involved in several collisions, she survived the war, and was sold for scrap in 1921.

Construction and design
Matchless was ordered from Swan Hunter as part of the 1913–1914 Construction Programme for the Royal Navy, one of six Admiralty M-class destroyers ordered under the programme, together with seven "builder's specials" which did not follow the standard design. Matchless was laid down at Swan Hunter's Wallsend, Tyneside shipyard on 8 November 1913, launched on 5 October 1914 and completed in December 1914, at a price of £118,581.

The ship's crew consisted of 80 officers and men. Armament consisted of three QF  Mk IV guns mounted on the ships centreline, together with two 2-pounder pom-pom anti-aircraft autocannons and four 21 inch (533 mm) torpedo tubes in two twin mounts.

Service

1915
On 1 January 1915, the battleship  was torpedoed and sunk by the German submarine  in the English Channel. Matchless, at sea at the time, was diverted to take part in the search for U-24. Matchless joined the Harwich Force, which operated in the North Sea and could reinforce the Grand Fleet or forces in the English Channel as required. On 31 January 1915, Matchless was one of seven destroyers of the Harwich Force dispatched to Sheerness to make part in minelaying operations east of the Straits of Dover to restrict the movements of German U-Boats. They continued escorting the minelayer  until 9 February. By June 1915, Matchless was listed as part of the 10th Destroyer Flotilla, as part of the Harwich Force.  On 13 June 1915, the 10th Destroyer Flotilla, including Matchless, was ordered to Avonmouth  for operations in the South-West Approaches, and in particular, to escort troopships carrying the 13th Division to the Middle East on the initial part of their journey, with two destroyers per transport. After the 13th Division had all left, the 10th Flotilla continued on escort duties based at Devonport, escorting the ships carrying the next division to be sent to the Gallipoli campaign, the 12th Division. The 10th Flotilla was relieved from its escort duty in July 1915, allowing it to return to Harwich. On 16 August 1915, 8 destroyers of the 10th Flotilla, including Matchless, escorted the minelayer  which was tasked with laying a minefield on the Arum Bank. The force encountered five patrolling German destroyers, and the German destroyer  torpedoed the destroyer , blowing off  Mentors bows, and then turned away. This caused the operation to be abandoned. Despite the damage, Mentor made it safely back to Harwich. On 30 October Matchless took part in a sweep by the Harwich Force of the German Bight during which the Swedish steamer Osterland was stopped and sent to the Humber for investigation of a suspicious cargo of iron ore.

Severe weather caused Admiral Reginald Tyrwhitt, commander of the Harwich Force, to order his destroyers back to base. On the return journey, Matchless struck a mine off Orfordness, on 9 November when travelling up a channel which had previously been swept clear of mines. Matchless stern was blown off, but none of the ship's crew was killed or injured. The damaged destroyer was taken under tow by sister ship  and successfully taken into Harwich. Matchless was repaired at Chatham Dockyard The mine had been laid by the German submarine  on 6–7 November.

1916
On 24 April 1916, a force of German battlecruisers and cruiser set out from Kiel to bombard the coastal towns of Lowestoft and Yarmouth. Later that day, the German battlecruiser  struck a mine, and the resultant radio traffic warned the British of the German operation. The light cruisers and five destroyers of the Harwich Force left port at midnight on the night of 24/25 April, with Matchless leaving Harwich just after 01:00hr Heavily outnumbered, Tyrwhitt turned away in an attempt to lure the German forces away from Lowestoft, but the Germans ignored this move and shelled Lowestoft before moving North towards their next target, Yarmouth. On observing this Tyrwhitt again turned his ships in pursuit of the raiders, and engaged the light cruisers screening the German force just as the German battlecruisers started to shell Yarmouth. The German battlecruisers aborted their bombardment to engage the Harwich force, hitting the cruiser  and the destroyer  but retired to the East rather than attempt to destroy the smaller British force. Matchless was undamaged.

On the night of 22 July 1916, two light cruisers and eight destroyers of the Harwich Force set out on a patrol to prevent German torpedo boats based in Flanders from interfering with shipping traffic between Britain and the Netherlands. One group, consisting of the light cruiser  and four destroyers, was to patrol off the Mass estuary, while the second group, led by the cruiser  and including Matchless, was to patrol off the North Hinder light vessel. Eight German destroyers of II Flotilla had set out from Zeebrugge on a mission to lay lines near the North Hinder light vessel, and at 00:15 on 23 July, Carysforts group sighted the German force, which turned away and escaped under the cover of a smoke screen and a rain storm. The Canterbury group, including Matchless, was ordered to proceed to the Schouwen Bank to intercept the Germans. They encountered the Germans at about 01:45, and set off in pursuit. The German destroyers managed to reach the safety of minefields and coastal defences near Zeebrugge, and the British broke off the chase.

On the night of 26/27 July 1916, Matchless was returning to Harwich after a collision with the destroyer , when she collided in thick fog with the torpedo boat , sinking TB 9. Matchless was still under repair on 19 August.

1917
Matchless was one of eight destroyers of the 10th Flotilla sent with the destroyer leader  to Dunkirk on 19 January 1917 to provide reinforcement to the Dover Patrol in the event of German torpedo attacks on the Dover Barrage and shipping in the English Channel. On 22 January, an intercepted German radio signal warned the British Admiralty that the German VI Torpedo Boat Flotilla was to be sent from the High Seas Fleet to reinforce their forces at Flanders. Six destroyers, including Matchless, were released with Nimrod back to the Harwich Force in order to take part in operations to stop the transfer of torpedo boats. The British set six light cruisers, two flotilla leaders and sixteen destroyers to intercept the eleven German ships, deploying them in several groups to make sure that all possible routes were covered. Matchless was one of six destroyers, led by Nimrod that were to patrol east of the Schouwen Bank. The German destroyers ran into a cruiser division, with the destroyers  and  heavily damaged, but the Germans managed to escape under the cover of a smokescreen. Nimrods group of destroyers headed north-east to cut-off the return route to the German Bight, but were ordered back to their station. The main group of German torpedo boats managed to sneak past the British patrols, but a straggler, which was following the same route, ran into the five destroyers patrolling west of the Schouwen Bank. An exchange of fire followed, in which S50 was hit several times by British shells, but managed to torpedo the British destroyer . Nimrods division spotted the fighting and came up from the east, but S50 escaped in the confusion, returning to Germany. Nimrod and Matchless both attempted to take the stricken Simoom under tow, but these attempts failed, and Simoom was scuttled by gunfire from Matchless.

On 10 February 1917, Matchless was escorting a convoy from the Netherlands to Britain when she spotted a submarine, possibly , and opened fire on the submarine, which dived away. After dropping a depth charge, Matchless returned to the convoy, calling up further ships to continue the hunt. Both the destroyer  and the patrol boat  sighted and attacked the submarine, which was undamaged.

On 9 April 1917, Matchless transferred to the Dover Patrol. That night, German torpedo boats launched an attack on the Channel, in what became known as the Battle of Dover Strait. Six torpedo boats (Group Gautier) were to bombard Dover and attack the Dover Barrage on the north side of the channel, with six more (Group Albrecht) were to attack Calais and the southern part of the barrage. Three more torpedo boats were to operate near the Downs. Group Albrecht arrived off Calais at about 23:15 hr and fired about 300 shells before withdrawing. While Matchlesss division spotted gunfire from this bombardment, they did not encounter any of the German ships. Group Gautier fired on and damaged an armed trawler, the Sabreur, and ineffectually shelled Dover. On 29 May, Matchless was accidentally rammed by the destroyer  and badly damaged. She was towed into Dover and beached to avoid sinking.

1918
On 22 April 1918, the British launched attacks against Zeebrugge and Ostend, with the intention of blocking the entrances to the canals linking these ports with Bruges and thus stopping U-boat operations from the Flanders ports. Matchless was assigned to the Ostend operation, patrolling off the port and supporting the small craft taking part in the operation. While the Zeebrugge operation partially blocked the canal locks, that at Ostend was a failure, and it was decided to repeat the Ostend operation as soon as practicable. The operation was repeated on the night of 9/10 May 1918, with Matchless again taking part of the operation. The operation was a failure, with the blockship  failing to block the main shipping channel. On the night of 28/29 September 1918, Matchless took part in a bombardment of German positions on the Belgian coast in support of the advance of Allied ground forces. Matchless remained part of the Dover patrol at the end of the war.

Disposal
By the end of the war, many of the M-class destroyers were worn-out, and by May 1919 Matchless was in reserve at the Nore. She was reduced to a Care and Maintenance party on 9 February 1920. Matchless was sold for scrap to the Barking Ship Breaking Company on 26 October 1921.

Pennant numbers

Notes

Citations

Bibliography
 
 

 

World War I destroyers of the United Kingdom
Ships built on the River Tyne
Admiralty M-class destroyers
1914 ships